GOdsownNZ was an unregistered political party in New Zealand. The party was Christian and socially conservative and described itself as "non-P.C.", but denied being "right wing" or "anti-refugee". It was founded in April 2017 by former Conservative Party of New Zealand board member Claire Holley.

The party initially planned to register, and applied for and was granted a broadcasting allocation in order to contest the 2017 election. In July 2017 it announced that it did not have sufficient members for registration, but that Holley would contest the West Coast-Tasman electorate. Holley had previously stood for this electorate, for the Conservative Party, in 2011 and 2014. Holley received 72 electorate votes in 2017, coming 8th out of 10 candidates.

See also

Christian politics in New Zealand

References

External links
 

Christian political parties in New Zealand
Political parties established in 2017
2017 establishments in New Zealand